Bengt Tandberg (14 December 1874 – 1 August 1948) was a Swedish painter. His work was part of the painting event in the art competition at the 1936 Summer Olympics.

References

1874 births
1948 deaths
20th-century Swedish painters
Swedish male painters
Olympic competitors in art competitions
Artists from Stockholm
20th-century Swedish male artists